Hibbertia crinita is a species of flowering plant in the family Dilleniaceae and is endemic to south-eastern continental Australia. It is a spreading to low-lying shrub with hairy foliage, linear to lance-shaped or elliptic leaves and yellow flowers with ten to fifteen stamens arranged on one side of two carpels.

Description
Flowering occurs from August to October.

The species was previously known as H. incana in New South Wales, a species now thought to be extinct and only known from the type specimen.

Taxonomy
Hibbertia crinita was first formally described in 2000 by Hellmut R. Toelken in the Journal of the Adelaide Botanic Gardens from specimens collected by Nik Donner at the "summit of Mt Torrens" in 1972. The specific epithet (crinita) means "having tufts of long, weak hairs".

Distribution and habitat
This hibbertia grows in heath, woodland and forest, often near granite or sandstone outcrops in shallow, stony soil. It occurs in Victoria, mainly north of the Great Dividing Range, in western New South Wales and in south-eastern South Australia.

See also
List of Hibbertia species

References

crinita
Flora of Victoria (Australia)
Flora of South Australia
Plants described in 2000
Taxa named by Hellmut R. Toelken